Manothrips is a genus of thrips in the family Phlaeothripidae.

Species
 Manothrips fortis

References

Phlaeothripidae
Thrips
Thrips genera